Ochodaeus pollens  is a beetle from the family Ochodaeidae. The scientific name of the species was first published in 1941 by Petrovitz.

References
 Hallan, J. (2010). Ochodaeus pollens Petrovitz, 1965. Based on information from the Encyclopedia of Life

Scarabaeiformia
Beetles described in 1941